With Vision is the second studio album  release by Place of Skulls. It was released in 2003 on the Southern Lord Records label. The recording of this album was marked by numerous personnel changes before the final staff was assembled. This is the only Place of Skulls album to feature Scott Weinrich (of The Obsessed, Saint Vitus, Spirit Caravan fame) on vocals and second guitar. He left to concentrate on The Hidden Hand. Writing credits are far more widely distributed among the band members than on their previous album.

Track listing
Songwriters are listed in brackets.
"Last Hit" (Griffin, Greg Turley, Weinrich) – 3:42
"With Vision" (Griffin) – 6:08
"Long Lost Grave" (Weinrich) – 5:54
"Nothing Changes" (Griffin, Turley) – 5:01
"Dimensional Sojourn" (Weinrich) – 2:49
"In Rest" (Griffin) – 1:21
"Silver Cord Breaks" (Griffin) – 5:23
"Willfully Blind" (Turley, Weinrich) – 3:08
"Dissonant Dissident" (Weinrich) – 1:52
"The Monster" (Griffin) – 5:01
"The Watchers" (Weinrich) – 4:38
"Lost" (Griffin) – 5:36

Personnel
Scott "Wino" Weinrich – guitar, vocals
Greg Turley – bass
Tim Tomaselli – drums
Mike Dearing – digital editing, assistant engineer
Jennifer Black – layout design
Travis Wyrick – producer, engineer, digital editing, mixing
Victor Griffin – guitar, vocals, producer, design

References

2003 albums
Place of Skulls (band) albums
Southern Lord Records albums
Albums produced by Travis Wyrick